Dunns Lake is a lake in Meeker County, in the U.S. state of Minnesota.

Dunns Lake was named for Timothy Dunn, a pioneer who settled there.

References

Lakes of Minnesota
Lakes of Meeker County, Minnesota